Bristol Revunions, or more commonly Revunions, is a sketch comedy society formed by students at the University of Bristol. Founded in the early 1950s, the group has produced many well-known alumni and continues to write and perform sketch material both within Bristol and at the Edinburgh Festival Fringe.

History

The earliest reference to Revunions dates back to 2 July 1953, although it is likely that the society existed before this date, making it the oldest performing arts society within the University of Bristol. Originally a dramatic society that performed a comedy revue on an annual basis, Revunions moved closer to its present-day status as a sketch comedy society within its first thirty years of existence. This progress was abruptly halted in the mid-1980s when the group faced bankruptcy, following the speculative disappearance of its treasurer to Paraguay along with the society's funds. As a result, the society entered a hiatus that was not ended until 2008, when the group was resurrected. Since then, the group has taken a series of shows to the Edinburgh Festival Fringe and performs its material throughout the greater Bristol area, often performing with the sister society Bristol Improv.

Alumni
David Bamber
Robert Carsen
Allan Corduner
Sue Jones-Davies
Jamie Demetriou
Natasia Demetriou
Greg Doran
Mat Ewins
Nicholas Farrell
Linda Gillard
Julia Hills
Chris Langham
Norman Lloyd-Edwards
Charlotte Ritchie
Alex Norris
Colin Sell
Alastair Stewart OBE
Ellie White
Kathryn Wolfe

Structure
Revunions is run by an annually-elected committee, led by a President. The President is assisted in their role by a Vice-President, Secretary and Treasurer, fulfilling various roles that assist with the running and promotion of the society.

The group meets weekly to create new material, rehearse and perform sketches, and produce several sketch shows each year.

List of presidents
The following members have led the society since it was reformed in 2008.

 2008/09 - Charlie Perkins
 2009/10 - Charlie Perkins
 2010/11 - Jamie Demetriou
 2011/12 - Matt Lister
 2012/13 - Ollie Jones-Evans
 2013/14 - Pete Simpson
 2014/15 - Will Blok
 2015/16 - Louis Dawson Jones
 2016/17 - Flora Donald
 2017/18 - Isabel Kilborn
 2018/19 - Ted Milligan
 2019/20 - Matthew Wilson
 2020/21 - Cecilia Orr
 2021/22 - Jack Bercovici
 2022/23 - Ed Daniels

See also
Cambridge Footlights
The Oxford Revue

References

External links
Bristol Revunions
University of Bristol

Student theatre in the United Kingdom